Gøsta Esping-Andersen (born 24 November 1947) is a Danish sociologist whose primary focus has been on the welfare state and its place in capitalist economies. Jacob Hacker describes him as the "dean of welfare state scholars." Over the past decade his research has moved towards family demographic issues. A synthesis of his work was published as Families in the 21st Century (Stockholm, SNS, 2016).

Esping-Anderson is a pioneer of power resource theory.

Academic career
Esping-Andersen completed his doctoral studies at the University of Wisconsin-Madison, writing a dissertation under the supervision of Gerald Marwell. While at Madison, Esping-Andersen also studied with Erik Olin Wright and Aage B. Sørensen, as well as Maurice Zeitlin, who mentored Esping-Andersen until his departure from the University of Wisconsin in 1977.

Esping-Andersen is professor emeritus at Pompeu Fabra University in Barcelona (Spain), and member of the Scientific Committee of the Juan March Institute and of the Board of Trustees and the Scientific Council at the IMDEA Social Sciences Institute, both in Madrid (Spain). He is a member of the American Academy of Social Sciences and the British Academy. He was awarded an honoris doctor causa from the University of Copenhagen in 2012. He is now a research professor at Bocconi University in Milan.

Major works
His most influential and highly cited book titled The Three Worlds of Welfare Capitalism was published in 1990 and laid out three main types of welfare states, in which modern developed capitalist nations cluster:
Liberal
Corporatist-Statist
Social Democratic

The traditional examples of the three types of welfare states are the United States (liberal), Germany (corporatist-statist) and Sweden (social democratic).

Other sociologists and political scientists went on to apply his theoretical analysis to the real world. One such example is a book entitled Real Worlds of Welfare Capitalism, written by Robert E. Goodin, Bruce Headey, Ruud Muffels, and Henk-Jan Dirven. While some critics claim Esping-Andersen's categories are becoming outdated, many political scientists are attracted by its intuitive simplicity.

In the past decade, his research has moved to demographic issues and in particular to the consequences of women's changing roles. He has developed a multiple equilibrium framework for the understanding of changing family behaviour. See in particular his Families in the 21st Century and Esping-Andersen and Billari (2015) and Retheorizing family demographic change. Population and Development Review (2015).

Criticism

The evolving nature of welfare states often makes it difficult to categorize. Arguably, many welfare states have components from some or all typologies, making them more akin to points on a continuum rather than rigid typologies, a fact Esping-Andersen acknowledges in his writings.

According to French sociologist, Georges Menahem, Esping-Andersen's "decommodification index" aggregates both qualitative and quantitative variables for ”sets of dimensions” which are fluid, and pertain to three very different areas.  Similarly, Menahem has concerns regarding the validity of the index, and its potential for replication.

In 1996, the Italian Social Scientist Maurizio Ferrera, further developed Esping-Andersen's Worlds of Welfare by identifying a fourth subtype of the welfare state model, the Southern European Model of Welfare.

Bibliography

Books 
 
 
 
 
 
 
 
 
 
 
 
  
Esping-Andersen, Gosta  Families in the 21st Century (Stockholm, 2016).

Notes

References

1947 births
Danish academics
Danish political scientists
Danish sociologists
Academic staff of the European University Institute
Living people
Academic staff of Pompeu Fabra University
People from Næstved Municipality
Corresponding Fellows of the British Academy